Jamesville-DeWitt High School (JDHS) is a New York state public education facility located in the town of DeWitt, serving high school students (grades 9–12) in the Jamesville-Dewitt Central School District.

Notable alumni

 Buddy Boeheim, professional basketball player in the NBA
 Tyler Cavanaugh, former professional basketball player in the NBA 
 Mark Dindal, filmmaker known for directing Cats Don't Dance, The Emperor's New Groove, and Chicken Little 
 Robert Drummond, former professional football player in the NFL and CFL
 Zackary Drucker, television producer and Emmy Award nominee for the docu-series This Is Me
 Jon Fishman, drummer and founding member of Phish
 Eliot Fisk, classical guitarist who has performed with orchestras around the world
 Andy Rautins, former professional basketball player in the GBL 
 Mike Royce, screenwriter and television producer; Emmy Award winner for Everybody Loves Raymond
 Danny Schayes, former professional basketball player in the NBA 
 Eric Schultz, political advisor and former deputy White House press secretary from 2014 to 2017
 Scott Schwedes, former professional football player in the NFL
 Suzy Whaley, former professional golfer on the LPGA Tour; first woman president of the PGA of America

References

External links
 Jamesville-DeWitt District Website
 

Public high schools in New York (state)
Schools in Onondaga County, New York
DeWitt, New York